Eerik Haamer (17 February 1908 – 4 November 1994) was an Estonian painter.

He was born in Kuressaare. In 1935 he graduated from Pallas Art School. 1941-1944 he taught at Tallinn Applied Art School. In 1944 he fled to Sweden. Since 1955 he was a freelance artist.

He is known for his epic paintings depicting the life of people living on the seashore, or relationships between man and nature, or between man and society.

References

1908 births
1994 deaths
20th-century Estonian painters
20th-century Estonian male artists
Estonian World War II refugees
Estonian emigrants to Sweden
People from Kuressaare